The 2022 UNAF U-16 Tournament is the 18th edition of the UNAF U-17 Tournament. The tournament will take place in Algeria, from 14 to 24 March 2022.

Participants

Venues

Squads

Match officials
Below the list of the referees:

Tournament
<onlyinclude>

All times are local, CET (UTC+1).

Statistics

Goalscorers

Broadcasting

References

External links
الاجتماع الفني لدورة اتحاد شمال افريقيا لكرة القدم لمنتخبات مواليد 2006 بالجزائر - UNAF official website

2022 in African football
UNAF U-17 Tournament
UNAF U-17 Tournament